Josef Anton Gartner (24 January 1954 – 1 June 1986) was a Formula One and sports car endurance driver from Austria. After a successful lower formula career, including a win in the Formula Two Pau Grand Prix, he participated in eight Formula One Grands Prix for Osella during the 1984 season, scoring no points. He was killed in an accident at the 1986 24 Hours of Le Mans.

Career

Early career
Gartner was born in Vienna.  In 1972, he began working for the Kaimann Formula Super Vee team in a technical capacity. After buying, modifying and selling a Formula Vee chassis of his own, Gartner began his motor sport career in some hillclimbing events in 1976. In 1977, aged 23, he started competing more seriously, driving in the Volkswagen-supported European Formula Super Vee championship. The following season he finished third in the championship.

He moved up to the European Formula Three Championship in 1979, driving a Martini with support from Renault, and switched to Formula Two in 1980 with a two-year-old March. On his Formula Two debut, Gartner's car was damaged by debris from the accident that killed his countryman Markus Höttinger. He was subsequently invited to take Höttinger's place in the BMW M1 Procar Championship series, in which he raced against Formula One drivers, driving for fellow Austrian Helmut Marko.

In 1981, Gartner drove a year-old Toleman TG280 at selected races and picked up a point with sixth place at the Enna-Pergusa round. He finished the season with two races for the Merzario team, finishing eighth at Mantorp Park. Continuing with Merzario for 1982, Gartner picked up his only point of the season with sixth at the opening round at Silverstone, but the car was generally uncompetitive in a strong field.

For 1983, Gartner decided to return to running his own car, an ex-works Spirit 201. After a fourth place at Hockenheim, he won the Pau Grand Prix when the first driver across the line, Alain Ferté, was disqualified because his car was underweight. This win enabled Gartner to gain the necessary sponsorship for a move to Formula One.

Formula One
In 1984, Gartner had secured the part-time second seat with the struggling Italian Osella team, as teammate to Piercarlo Ghinzani, driving a year-old, non-turbo FA1E. He qualified on his debut at the 1984 San Marino Grand Prix, but his race ended with an engine failure. At his next race, Gartner was given the new turbocharged Osella FA1F as the team decided to run a second car at all the remaining races. At the 1984 British Grand Prix, Gartner was allowed to start in 27th position because the Tyrrell Racing team was participating under appeal. However, his race ended when he was unable to avoid a first-lap accident involving Philippe Alliot and Eddie Cheever. After mechanical failures in the next two races, he finished 12th at the Dutch Grand Prix, five laps down on the winner Alain Prost.

At the Italian Grand Prix at Monza, Gartner qualified 24th but finished fifth, beating fellow Austrian Gerhard Berger into sixth after Ghinzani and Cheever ran out of fuel. However, Gartner was denied the two points normally awarded to the fifth-place finisher, as Osella had only entered one car at the beginning of the season. Berger in sixth was similarly denied his single point, driving for ATS.

Classified 12th at the European Grand Prix although he retired with fuel injection problems, Gartner closed the season with a 16th place classification in Portugal, having run out of fuel. For 1985, he was in contention for a seat at Arrows, but lost out to Berger. He also held talks with Toleman and Osella, but both seats went to drivers with more finance in place.

Endurance racing
Gartner had finished fourth in the 1985 24 Hours of Le Mans in a Porsche 962C along with teammates David Hobbs and Guy Edwards. In 1985, after his season in Formula One, he joined the Fitzpatrick Porsche Group C endurance racing team, driving a Porsche 956, and also campaigned a Porsche 962 for Bob Akin in the IMSA GT Championship. He won the 1986 12 Hours of Sebring, along with teammates Akin and Hans-Joachim Stuck, finishing on three wheels, and also won an international race at Thruxton with Tiff Needell. Gartner was aiming to join the factory Rothman's Porsche team for 1987.

The car somersaulted down the track, hit a telephone pole, crashed into trees and then caught fire after it came to a rest on top of the barriers on the opposite side of the track. The accident took out 100 meters of guardrail and debris was strewn over 200 meters. Gartner was killed on impact, due to a broken neck. Although the cause of the accident was never determined, two marshals saw Gartner brake on the straight before the car veered off into the barriers. Gartner was the last fatality at the Le Mans 24 Hours under race conditions until Allan Simonsen was killed in the 2013 race.

Racing record

Complete European Formula Two Championship results
(key)

Complete Formula One results
(key) 

Notes
 – Gartner was driving his team's "second entry", and as the team had only entered one car for the entire championship, the second entry was ineligible to score championship points.

24 Hours of Le Mans results

References

Austrian racing drivers
Austrian Formula One drivers
Osella Formula One drivers
European Formula Two Championship drivers
Racing drivers who died while racing
1954 births
1986 deaths
Sport deaths in France
24 Hours of Le Mans drivers
World Sportscar Championship drivers
12 Hours of Sebring drivers